Raymond Tuttle "Scooter" McLean (December 6, 1915 – March 4, 1964) was an American football player and coach at both the collegiate and professional levels, He was a member of four NFL championship teams with the Chicago Bears in 1940, 1941, 1943, and 1946.  He may be best remembered for preceding Vince Lombardi as head coach of the Green Bay Packers in 1958.

Early years
Born in Lowell, Massachusetts and raised in Concord, New Hampshire, McLean went to prep school at Cushing Academy in Ashburnham, Massachusetts, then played both football and basketball in New Hampshire at St. Anselm College in Goffstown.

Playing career
He was selected by the Chicago Bears in the 21st round of the 1940 NFL Draft and played eight years with the team, and also found time during the offseason to play semipro baseball. His real last name is "MacLean," and was changed because the press consistently misspelled it.

Common for the era, McLean played on both sides of the ball, catching 103 passes for over 2,200 yards and 21 touchdowns, while also gaining 412 yards via the running game.  On defense, he intercepted 18 opponent tosses, while his special teams work also sparkled with three punt returns for touchdowns, one an 89-yard dash against the crosstown Chicago Cardinals.  In his final season in 1947, he also was the team's kicker.

McLean is also remembered for his successful drop kicked extra point in the Bears' 37–9 championship game win over the New York Giants on December 21, 1941. For 64 years, this would be the last score via this play in the NFL until New England Patriots' quarterback Doug Flutie's drop kicked conversion in a 28–26 loss to the Miami Dolphins in the regular season finale on January 1, 2006. Drop kicks had been a common part of the game until 1934 when the game's watermelon-shaped ball was replaced with the modern prolate spheroid, which made passing easier but drop kicking less reliable, led to their decline and virtual extinction. The last successfully drop kicked field goal still belongs to Earl "Dutch" Clark of the Detroit Lions, which he scored during a 16–7 win over the Chicago Cardinals on September 19, 1937.

Coaching career

Lewis College
On March 3, 1948, McLean signed a contract to serve as head coach of Lewis College in Lockport, Illinois, southwest of Chicago.  To supplement his income during that first year, he also served as an assistant coach with the Chicago Rockets of the All-America Football Conference.  During his first two seasons at Lewis, McLean's teams completely dominated, outscoring opponents 548–80 while compiling a 14–2 record.  In 1950, the school moved to the much stronger Midlands Intercollegiate Athletic Conference, but McLean left after that campaign to become an assistant with the Packers in 1951.

Green Bay Packers
Working under second-year head coach Gene Ronzani, McLean watched the Packers struggle with a 3–9 mark in 1951, but then improved by three games the following year.  However, after winning just twice in ten games in 1953, Ronzani resigned following a Thanksgiving Day loss at Detroit, with two games remaining. McLean and fellow Packer assistant Hugh Devore completed the season as co-head coaches; Green Bay lost both road games in California to extend the season's losing streak to five games and finish at 2–9–1.

McLean was the only assistant retained in 1954 by new head coach Lisle Blackbourn and returned to his role as the backfield coach. The Packers won four games in 1954 and were a .500 team in 1955, but a 17–31 record over four seasons led to another coaching change in Green Bay after the 1957 season, their first in the new City Stadium (renamed Lambeau Field in 1965). On January 6, Blackbourn was fired and the 42-year-old McLean was immediately elevated to the top position for 1958, but with only a one-year contract. Unfortunately, the team bottomed-out under his leadership, which included players deciding how they should discipline themselves. The Packers finished the season with a franchise-worst 1–10–1 record, with a roster laden with future All-Pro and hall of fame players.  McLean's contract expired on December 31 and he resigned days after the conclusion of the season, which opened the way for the hiring of Lombardi in January 1959.

Detroit Lions
McLean immediately found work as an assistant with the Detroit Lions, under former Bears teammate George Wilson, and served in that role for the next five years. Wilson, his road roommate in Chicago, had offered the job a year earlier before McLean became the head coach.

Death
Midway through the 1963 season, McLean entered an Ann Arbor hospital and was diagnosed with cancer; he died several months later at age 48, leaving a wife and four children. He was buried in Michigan at Oakland Hills Memorial Gardens Cemetery in Novi.

References

External links
 
 

1915 births
1964 deaths
American football drop kickers
American football halfbacks
American men's basketball players
Chicago Bears players
Detroit Lions coaches
Green Bay Packers head coaches
Lewis Flyers football coaches
Lewis Flyers men's basketball coaches
Saint Anselm Hawks football players
Saint Anselm Hawks men's basketball players
Sportspeople from Lowell, Massachusetts
Coaches of American football from Massachusetts
Players of American football from Massachusetts
Basketball coaches from Massachusetts
Basketball players from Massachusetts
Deaths from cancer in Michigan